CofC may refer to:

 Church of Christ, non-denominational Christian church influenced by the Restoration Movement
 Community of Christ, American-based international church, focused on peace and justice
 College of Charleston, public university located in Charleston, South Carolina
 Certificate of Conformity, Conformance or Compliance Certificate of Conformity
 2-phospho-L-lactate guanylyltransferase, an enzyme

CoFC may refer to:
United States Court of Federal Claims

COFC may refer to:
"Container on Flatcar", a form of intermodal freight transport with intermodal containers
 Certificate of Formula Compliance Certificate of Formula Compliance
Cherry Orchard F.C., an Irish football club
Cookstown Olympic F.C., a Northern Irish football club